Truro is a city in southeast Madison County, Iowa, United States. The population was 509 at the time of the 2020 census. Truro is part of the Des Moines–West Des Moines Metropolitan Statistical Area.

History
Truro was laid out and platted in 1881. It was first settled as Ohio Township in the early 1850s, by settlers who came primarily from Ohio. In 1881 the town was named after the city of Truro in Cornwall, United Kingdom, by suggestion of the local train conductor, whose hometown was Truro, Cape Cod, MA.

Geography
Truro is located at  (41.208372, -93.845496).

Demographics

2010 census
As of the census of 2010, there were 485 people, 163 households, and 122 families living in the city. The racial makeup of the city was 98.4% White, 0.4% Native American, 0.4% Asian, 0.2% from other races, and 0.6% from two or more races. Hispanic or Latino of any race were 0.2% of the population.

There were 163 households, of which 53.4% had children under the age of 18 living with them, 57.1% were married couples living together, 11.0% had a female householder with no husband present, 6.7% had a male householder with no wife present, and 25.2% were non-families. 23.3% of all households were made up of individuals, and 10.4% had someone living alone who was 65 years of age or older. The average household size was 2.98 and the average family size was 3.47.

The median age in the city was 29.6 years. 38.8% of residents were under the age of 18; 5.3% were between the ages of 18 and 24; 30% were from 25 to 44; 15.6% were from 45 to 64; and 10.1% were 65 years of age or older. The gender makeup of the city was 47.8% male and 52.2% female.

2000 census
As of the census of 2000, there were 427 people, 156 households, and 116 families living in the city. The racial makeup of the city was 96.96% White, 2.11% Native American, and 0.94% from two or more races. Hispanic or Latino of any race were 1.87% of the population.

There were 156 households, out of which 39.1% had children under the age of 18 living with them, 59.0% were married couples living together, 9.6% had a female householder with no husband present, and 25.6% were non-families. 22.4% of all households were made up of individuals, and 14.1% had someone living alone who was 65 years of age or older. The average household size was 2.74 and the average family size was 3.21.

In the city, the population was spread out, with 34.0% under the age of 18, 6.3% from 18 to 24, 27.4% from 25 to 44, 17.8% from 45 to 64, and 14.5% who were 65 years of age or older. The median age was 33 years. For every 100 females, there were 90.6 males. For every 100 females age 18 and over, there were 88.0 males.

The median income for a household in the city was $33,750, and the median income for a family was $39,500. Males had a median income of $30,833 versus $22,500 for females. The per capita income for the city was $15,021. About 6.3% of families and 10.3% of the population were below the poverty line, including 13.6% of those under age 18 and 14.5% of those age 65 or over.

Education
Interstate 35 Community School District serves the municipality. The Interstate 35 Elementary, Middle & High schools are located in Truro.

Notable people
Fon Huffman, United States Navy veteran
Kim Reynolds, 43rd and current Governor of Iowa
James William "Ducky" Holmes, Major League Baseball Player, Outfielder, 10 seasons, 7 teams
Tobin Anderson, Head Men's Basketball Coach, Fairleigh Dickinson University

References

External links

City-Data Comprehensive statistical data and more about Truro

Cities in Madison County, Iowa
Cities in Iowa
Des Moines metropolitan area
1881 establishments in Iowa